The men's hammer throw event at the 2014 World Junior Championships in Athletics was held in Eugene, Oregon, USA, at Hayward Field on 24 and 25 July.  A 6 kg (junior implement) hammer was used.

Medalists

Results

Final
25 July
Start time: 17:59  Temperature: 28 °C  Humidity: 33 %
End time: 19:13  Temperature: 27 °C  Humidity: 37 %

Qualifications
24 July
With qualifying standard of 74.50 (Q) or at least the 12 best performers (q) advance to the Final

Summary

Details
With qualifying standard of 74.50 (Q) or at least the 12 best performers (q) advance to the Final

Group A
25 July
Start time; 10:30  Temperature: 16 °C  Humidity: 68 %
End time: 11:09  Temperature: 20 °C  Humidity: 56 %

Group B
25 July
Start time; 11:59  Temperature: 20 °C  Humidity: 56 %
End time: 12:41  Temperature: 21 °C  Humidity: 53 %

Participation
According to an unofficial count, 26 athletes from 18 countries participated in the event.

References

Hammer throw
Hammer throw at the World Athletics U20 Championships